The men's Individual normal hill ski jumping event at the FIS Nordic World Ski Championships 2013 was held on 23 February 2013 with the qualification being held on 22 February 2013.

Results

Qualifying
The Qualifying was held at 18:07.

Final
The final was started at 17:00.

References

FIS Nordic World Ski Championships 2013